The Spain men's national basketball team represents Spain in international basketball competitions. They are managed by the Spanish Basketball Federation, the governing body for basketball in Spain. Spain is the current World and European champion.

Spain has appeared 32 times at the EuroBasket, winning four gold medals, six silver medals, and four bronze medals. They have also competed at the Summer Olympics 13 times, with three silver medals and one bronze medal as their accomplishments. They have qualified for the FIBA World Cup 12 times, winning it twice, in 2006 and 2019.

Spain is currently ranked first in the FIBA World Ranking, surpassing the United States in 2022.

History

Olympic Games
When Spain qualified for the 1936 Summer Olympics, where basketball was part of the games for the first time, expectations were high for the runners-up of the 1935 EuroBasket. Unfortunately, as one of the favorites to win medals, Spain could not attend the Games due to the outbreak of the Spanish Civil War just days before the start of the event.

Spain's first Olympic success came at the 1984 Summer Olympics. The team made it all the way to the gold medal game, before losing to the United States (led by Patrick Ewing and featuring a young Michael Jordan).

At the 2008 Summer Olympics, Spain reached the gold medal game for the second time. However, in a rematch of the 1984 Olympic final, Spain fell to the United States once more. This time led by Kobe Bryant and nicknamed the "Redeem Team". The Americans won after a remarkably close game 118–107. Four years later, at the 2012 Summer Olympics in London, the United States faced Spain in the Olympic final for the third time. The USA would go on to win gold again, by the score of 107–100, with Spain coming away with its third Olympic (and second straight) silver medal. During the 2016 Summer Olympics, Spain reached the bronze medal match against Australia, where they escaped with an narrow 89–88 victory.

FIBA World Cup
During the early years of the FIBA World Cup, Spain struggled to establish a steady presence as a competitor. Between 1950 and 1970, the national team only qualified once. Then, beginning in 1974, Spain developed into a serious competitor and regularly finished among the World Cup top performers in the competitions to follow.

At the 2006 FIBA World Cup, Spain achieved their greatest success in its history, as they defeated Greece in the final to capture their first World Cup title. Held at the Saitama Super Arena in Japan, the game ended by the final score of 70–47. Furthermore, Pau Gasol was named the tournament MVP, while Jorge Garbajosa was selected to the All-Tournament team. Shortly afterwards, the team were awarded with the 2006 Prince of Asturias Award in Sports.

At the 2019 FIBA World Cup, Spain won their second World Cup title by defeating Argentina in the final by the score of 95–75. The spectacular play of Ricky Rubio during the tournament earned him the MVP, while Marc Gasol was named to the All-Tournament team. After this victory, Marc Gasol became the second player in tournament history to win the NBA title and the World Cup in the same year; with the other being Lamar Odom.

EuroBasket
The first game in the history of the selection was a qualifier for the EuroBasket 1935, where Spain defeated Portugal 33–12. This event, which was held in Geneva in the summer of 1935, was the first EuroBasket game in history. Spain went on to finish as runners-up in the tournament behind Latvia.

After coming in second in 1935, 1973, 1983, 1999, 2003, and 2007, Spain won their first continental championship in 2009; defeating Serbia to become European champions. The team repeated their success in 2011, taking out France in the final. At EuroBasket 2015, Spain once again reached the title game, and demolished Lithuania in the process 80–63. Two years after winning it all in 2015, Spain followed it up with another strong performance at EuroBasket 2017, defeating Russia to win the bronze medal match. It marked the fourth time Spain won bronze at the EuroBasket, as they also won it in 1991, 2001, and 2013.

Spain captured their fourth European title at the EuroBasket 2022, after defeating France in the final once again, a rematch of the 2011 title game. Additionally, center Willy Hernangómez was selected as tournament MVP.

Other events
Besides success at the "Big Three" events (Summer Olympic Games, FIBA World Cup, and EuroBasket) Spain has also had success at the Mediterranean Games, where it has won several medals: three gold, four silver and one bronze.

Medal record
The Spain national team's medal record through the years:

Olympic Games
 Silver medals: 1984, 2008, 2012
 Bronze medals: 2016

FIBA World Cup
 Gold medals: 2006, 2019

EuroBasket
 Gold medals: 2009, 2011, 2015, 2022
 Silver medals: 1935, 1973, 1983, 1999, 2003, 2007
 Bronze medals: 1991, 2001, 2013, 2017

Mediterranean Games
 Gold medal: 1955, 1997, 2001
 Silver medals: 1951, 1959, 1963, 1987
 Bronze medals: 2005

Competitive record

FIBA World Cup

Olympic Games

Notes
 Spain withdrew due to Spanish Civil War.FIBA considers two games as forfeited (walkover)

EuroBasket

Results and fixtures

2021

2022

2023

Team

Current roster
Roster for the 2023 FIBA World Cup Qualifiers matches on 23 and 26 February 2023 against Iceland and Italy.

Depth chart

Past rosters
1935 EuroBasket: finished 2nd  among 10 teams

2 Juan Carbonell, 3 Pedro Alonso, 4 Emilio Alonso, 5 Cayetano Ortega, 6 Rafael Ruano, 7 Rafael Martín (MVP), 8 Armando Maunier, 9 Fernando Muscat (Coach: Mariano Manent)

1950 FIBA World Cup: finished 9th among 10 teams

3 Arturo Imedio, 4 Jaime Basso, 5 Andrés Oller, 6 Álvaro Salvadores, 7 Juan Dalmau, 8 Julio Gámez, 9 Eduardo Kucharski, 10 Ángel González, 11 Ángel Lozano, 12 Domingo Bárcenas, 13 Juan Ferrando, 14 Ignacio Pinedo (Coach: Michael Paul Rutzgis)

1959 EuroBasket: finished 15th among 17 teams

3 Alfonso Martínez, 4 José Luis Martínez Gómez, 5 Francisco Capel, 6 Jorge Parra, 7 Joaquín Hernández Gallego, 8 José Lluis, 9 José Brunet, 10 Emiliano Rodríguez, 11 Juan Canals, 12 Francisco Buscató, 13 Francisco Borrell, 14 Arturo Auladell (Coach: Gabriel Alberti)

1960 Olympic Games: finished 14th among 16 teams

3 Agustín Bertomeu, 4 José Nora, 5 Alfonso Martínez, 6 Joaquín Enseñat, 7 Santiago Navarro, 8 José Lluis, 9 Jorge Guillén, 10 Emiliano Rodríguez, 11 Jesús "Chus" Codina, 12 Miguel Ángel González, 13 Francisco Buscató, 14 Juan Martos (Coach: Eduardo Kucharski González)

1961 EuroBasket: finished 13th among 19 teams

4 Santiago Navarro, 5 Lorenzo Alocén, 6 Juan Martos, 7 Jesús "Chus" Codina, 8 José Lluis, 9 José Nora, 10 Emiliano Rodríguez, 11 Alfonso Martínez, 12 Carlos Sevillano, 13 Francisco Buscató, 14 Lolo Sainz, 15 Javier Sanjuán (Coach: Fernando Font)

1963 EuroBasket: finished 7th among 16 teams

4 Juan Antonio Martínez Arroyo, 5 Moncho Monsalve, 6 Miguel Ángel González, 7 Jesús "Chus" Codina, 8 José Lluis, 9 Arturo Auladell, 10 Emiliano Rodríguez (MVP), 11 Carlos Sevillano, 12 Alfonso Martínez, 13 Francisco Buscató, 14 Lolo Sainz, 15 José Ramón Ramos (Coach: Joaquín Hernández Gallego)

1965 EuroBasket: finished 11th among 16 teams

4 Juan Antonio Martínez Arroyo, 5 Joan Fa Busquets, 6 Miguel Ángel González, 7 Lolo Sainz, 8 José Lluis, 9 Enrique Margall, 10 Emiliano Rodríguez, 11 Carlos Sevillano, 12 Juan Bautista Urberuaga, 13 Francisco Buscató, 14 Moncho Monsalve, 15 José Ramón Ramos (Coach: Pedro Ferrandiz González)

1967 EuroBasket: finished 10th among 16 teams

4 Ramón Guardiola, 5 Ángel Serrano, 6 Carlos Luquero, 7 Enrique Margall, 8 José Luis Sagi-Vela, 9 Antonio "Toncho" Nava, 10 Emiliano Rodríguez, 11 José Laso, 12 Alfonso Martínez, 13 Francisco Buscató, 14 Moncho Monsalve, 15 José Ramón Ramos (Coach: Antonio Díaz-Miguel)

1968 Olympic Games: finished 7th among 16 teams

4 Juan Antonio Martínez Arroyo, 5 Vicente Ramos Cecilio, 6 Luis Carlos Santiago, 7 Jesús "Chus" Codina, 8 Enrique Margall, 9 Antonio "Toncho" Nava, 10 Emiliano Rodríguez, 11 Clifford Luyk, 12 José Luis Sagi-Vela, 13 Francisco Buscató, 14 Lorenzo Alocén, 15 Alfonso Martínez (Coach: Antonio Díaz-Miguel)

1969 EuroBasket: finished 5th among 12 teams

4 Víctor Escorial, 5 Vicente Ramos Cecilio, 6 Cristóbal Rodríguez, 7 Jesús Codina, 8 Enrique Margall, 9 Antonio Nava, 10 Emiliano Rodríguez, 11 Clifford Luyk, 12 José Luis Sagi-Vela, 13 Francisco Buscató, 14 Lorenzo Alocén, 15 Alfonso Martínez (Coach: Antonio Díaz-Miguel)

1971 EuroBasket: finished 7th among 12 teams

4 Juan Antonio Martínez Arroyo, 5 Vicente Ramos Cecilio, 6 Alfonso Martínez, 7 Enrique Margall, 8 Rafael Rullán, 9 Luis Miguel Santillana, 10 Emiliano Rodríguez, 11 Francisco Buscató, 12 José Luis Sagi-Vela, 13 Clifford Luyk, 14 Wayne Brabender, 15 Cristóbal Rodríguez (Coach: Antonio Díaz-Miguel)

1972 Olympic Games: finished 11th among 16 teams

4 Wayne Brabender, 5 Vicente Ramos Cecilio, 6 Carmelo Cabrera, 7 Enrique Margall, 8 Luis Miguel Santillana, 9 Jesús Iradier, 10 Francisco Buscató, 11 Juan Antonio Corbalán, 12 Rafael Rullán, 13 Clifford Luyk, 14 Miguel Ángel Estrada, 15 Gonzalo Sagi-Vela (Coach: Antonio Díaz-Miguel)

1973 EuroBasket: finished 2nd  among 12 teams

4 Wayne Brabender (MVP), 5 Vicente Ramos Cecilio, 6 Carmelo Cabrera, 7 Enrique Margall, 8 Luis Miguel Santillana, 9 Rafael Rullán, 10 Francisco Buscató, 11 Manuel Flores, 12 José Luis Sagi-Vela, 13 Clifford Luyk, 14 Miguel Ángel Estrada, 15 Gonzalo Sagi-Vela (Coach: Antonio Díaz-Miguel)

1974 FIBA World Cup: finished 5th among 14 teams

4 Wayne Brabender, 5 Vicente Ramos Cecilio, 6 Cristóbal Rodríguez, 7 Carmelo Cabrera, 8 Luis Miguel Santillana, 9 Rafael Rullán, 10 Jesús Iradier, 11 Juan Antonio Corbalán, 12 José Luis Sagi-Vela, 13 Clifford Luyk, 14 Miguel Ángel Estrada, 15 Manuel Flores (Coach: Antonio Díaz-Miguel)

1975 EuroBasket: finished 4th among 12 teams

4 Wayne Brabender, 5 Miguel Ángel Lopez-Abril, 6 Cristóbal Rodríguez, 7 Carmelo Cabrera, 8 Luis Miguel Santillana, 9 Joan Filbá, 10 Jesús Iradier, 11 Juan Antonio Corbalán, 12 Rafael Rullán, 13 Clifford Luyk, 14 Miguel Ángel Estrada, 15 Manuel Flores (Coach: Antonio Díaz-Miguel)

1977 EuroBasket: finished 9th among 12 teams

4 Wayne Brabender, 5 Juan Domingo de la Cruz, 6 Juan Ramón Fernández, 7 Carmelo Cabrera, 8 Luis Miguel Santillana, 9 Joan Filbá, 10 Luis María Prada, 11 Juan Antonio Corbalán, 12 Rafael Rullán, 13 Josep Maria Margall, 14 Gonzalo Sagi-Vela, 15 Manuel Flores (Coach: Antonio Díaz-Miguel)

1979 EuroBasket: finished 6th among 12 teams

4 Wayne Brabender, 5 Quim Costa, 6 José Luis Llorente, 7 Josep Maria Margall, 8 Manuel Flores, 9 Pedro César Ansa, 10 Luis Miguel Santillana, 11 Juan Antonio Corbalán, 12 Rafael Rullán, 13 Juan Domingo de la Cruz, 14 Juan Manuel López Iturriaga, 15 Juan Antonio "Epi" San Epifanio (Coach: Antonio Díaz-Miguel)

1980 Olympic Games: finished 4th among 12 teams

4 Wayne Brabender, 5 José Luis Llorente, 6 Cándido "Chicho" Sibilio, 7 Josep Maria Margall, 8 Manuel Flores, 9 Fernando Romay, 10 Luis Miguel Santillana, 11 Juan Antonio Corbalán, 12 Ignacio "Nacho" Solozábal, 13 Juan Domingo de la Cruz, 14 Juan Manuel López Iturriaga, 15 Juan Antonio "Epi" San Epifanio (Coach: Antonio Díaz-Miguel)

1981 EuroBasket: finished 4th among 12 teams

4 Wayne Brabender, 5 Quim Costa, 6 Cándido "Chicho" Sibilio, 7 Josep Maria Margall, 8 Manuel Flores, 9 Fernando Romay, 10 Fernando Martín, 11 Juan Antonio Corbalán, 12 Rafael Rullán, 13 Juan Domingo de la Cruz, 14 Ignacio "Nacho" Solozábal, 15 Juan Antonio "Epi" San Epifanio (Coach: Antonio Díaz-Miguel)

1982 FIBA World Cup: finished 4th among 13 teams

4 Wayne Brabender, 5 Quim Costa, 6 Cándido "Chicho" Sibilio, 7 Josep Maria Margall, 8 Andrés Jiménez Fernández, 9 Fernando Romay, 10 Fernando Martín, 11 Juan Antonio Corbalán, 12 Ignacio "Nacho" Solozábal, 13 Juan Domingo de la Cruz, 14 Juan Manuel López Iturriaga, 15 Juan Antonio "Epi" San Epifanio (Coach: Antonio Díaz-Miguel)

1983 EuroBasket: finished 2nd  among 12 teams

4 Fernando Arcega, 5 Joan "Chichi" Creus, 6 Cándido "Chicho" Sibilio, 7 Josep Maria Margall, 8 Andrés Jiménez Fernández, 9 Fernando Romay, 10 Fernando Martín, 11 Juan Antonio Corbalán (MVP), 12 Ignacio "Nacho" Solozábal, 13 Juan Domingo de la Cruz, 14 Juan Manuel López Iturriaga, 15 Juan Antonio "Epi" San Epifanio (Coach: Antonio Díaz-Miguel)

1984 Olympic Games: finished 2nd  among 12 teams

4 José Manuel Beirán, 5 José Luis Llorente, 6 Fernando Arcega, 7 Josep Maria Margall, 8 Andrés Jiménez Fernández, 9 Fernando Romay, 10 Fernando Martín, 11 Juan Antonio Corbalán, 12 Ignacio "Nacho" Solozábal, 13 Juan Domingo de la Cruz, 14 Juan Manuel López Iturriaga, 15 Juan Antonio "Epi" San Epifanio (Coach: Antonio Díaz-Miguel)

1985 EuroBasket: finished 4th among 12 teams

4 Jordi Villacampa, 5 José Luis Llorente, 6 Cándido "Chicho" Sibilio, 7 Josep Maria Margall, 8 Andrés Jiménez Fernández, 9 Fernando Romay, 10 Fernando Martín, 11 Vicente Gil, 12 Quim Costa, 13 Juan Domingo de la Cruz, 14 Juan Manuel López Iturriaga, 15 Juan Antonio "Epi" San Epifanio (Coach: Antonio Díaz-Miguel)

1986 FIBA World Cup: finished 5th among 24 teams

4 Jordi Villacampa, 5 Quim Costa, 6 Cándido "Chicho" Sibilio, 7 Josep Maria Margall, 8 Andrés Jiménez Fernández, 9 Fernando Romay, 10 Fernando Martín, 11 Fernando Arcega, 12 Ignacio "Nacho" Solozábal, 13 Juan Domingo de la Cruz, 14 Joan "Chichi" Creus, 15 Juan Antonio "Epi" San Epifanio (Coach: Antonio Díaz-Miguel)

1987 EuroBasket: finished 4th among 12 teams

4 Jordi Villacampa, 5 Francisco Javier Zapata, 6 Cándido "Chicho" Sibilio, 7 Josep Maria Margall, 8 Andrés Jiménez Fernández, 9 Fernando Romay, 10 José Antonio Montero, 11 Fernando Arcega, 12 Ignacio Solozábal, 13 Ferran Martínez, 14 José Ángel Arcega, 15 Juan Antonio "Epi" San Epifanio (Coach: Antonio Díaz-Miguel)

1988 Olympic Games: finished 8th among 12 teams

4 Jordi Villacampa, 5 José Luis Llorente, 6 José Biriukov, 7 Josep Maria Margall, 8 Andrés Jiménez Fernández, 9 Enrique “Quique” Andreu, 10 José Antonio Montero, 11 Fernando Arcega, 12 Ignacio Solozábal, 13 Ferran Martínez, 14 Antonio Martín Espina, 15 Juan Antonio "Epi" San Epifanio (Coach: Antonio Díaz-Miguel)

1989 EuroBasket: finished 5th among 8 teams

4 Rafael Vecina, 5 José Ángel Arcega, 6 José Biriukov, 7 Pablo Laso, 8 Andrés Jiménez Fernández, 9 Enrique “Quique” Andreu, 10 José Antonio Montero, 11 Enrique Villalobos, 12 Juan Antonio Morales, 13 Ferran Martínez, 14 Manuel Ángel Aller, 15 Juan Antonio "Epi" San Epifanio (Coach: Antonio Díaz-Miguel)

1990 FIBA World Cup: finished 10th among 16 teams

4 Jordi Villacampa, 5 José Angel Arcega, 6 José Miguel Antúnez, 7 Rafael Jofresa, 8 Andrés Jiménez Fernández, 9 Fernando Romay, 10 José Antonio Montero, 11 Alberto Herreros, 12 Manel Bosch, 13 Ferran Martínez, 14 Enrique Andreu, 15 Francisco J. Zapata (Coach: Antonio Díaz-Miguel)

1991 EuroBasket: finished 3rd  among 8 teams

4 Jordi Villacampa, 5 Mike Hansen, 6 José Miguel Antúnez, 7 Rafael Jofresa, 8 Enrique “Quique” Andreu, 9 Manel Bosch, 10 Josep “Pep” Cargol, 11 Fernando Arcega, 12 Juan Antonio Orenga, 13 Silvano Bustos, 14 Antonio Martín Espina, 15 Juan Antonio "Epi" San Epifanio (Coach: Antonio Díaz-Miguel)

1992 Olympic Games: finished 9th among 12 teams

4 Jordi Villacampa, 5 José Arcega, 6 José Biriukov, 7 Rafael Jofresa, 8 Andrés Jiménez, 9 Santiago Aldama, 10 Tomás Jofresa, 11 Xavi Fernández, 12 Alberto Herreros, 13 Juan Antonio Orenga, 14 Enrique Andreu, 15 Juan Antonio "Epi" San Epifanio (Coach: Antonio Díaz-Miguel)

1993 EuroBasket: finished 5th among 16 teams

4 Jordi Villacampa, 5 Rafael Jofresa, 6 Tomas Jofresa, 7 Juan Antonio Orenga, 8 Andrés Jiménez, 9 Juan Antonio Morales, 10 Ignacio “Nacho” Azofra, 11 Alberto Herreros, 12 Xavier “Xavi” Crespo, 13 Ferran Martínez, 14 Antonio Martín Espina, 15 Juan Antonio "Epi" San Epifanio (Coach: Lolo Sainz)

1994 FIBA World Cup: finished 10th among 16 teams

4 Andrés Jiménez, 5 Enrique Andreu, 6 Alberto Herreros, 7 José Cargol, 8 Ferran Martínez, 9 Juan Antonio Orenga, 10 José Miguel Antúnez, 11 Rafael Vecina, 12 Rafael Jofresa, 13 Pablo Laso, 14 Juan Antonio "Epi" San Epifanio, 15 Jordi Villacampa (Coach: Lolo Sainz)

1995 EuroBasket: finished 6th among 14 teams

4 Alberto Angulo, 5 José Luis Galilea, 6 Mike Smith, 7 Juan Antonio Orenga, 8 Ignacio Rodríguez, 9 Pablo Laso, 10 Xavi Fernández, 11 Alberto Herreros, 12 Alfonso Reyes, 13 Ferran Martínez, 14 Antonio Martín Espina, 15 Fran Murcia (Coach: Lolo Sainz)

1997 EuroBasket: finished 5th among 16 teams

4 Alberto Angulo, 5 José Luis Galilea, 6 Tomás Jofresa, 7 Juan Antonio Orenga, 8 Ignacio Rodríguez, 9 Mike Smith, 10 Roger Esteller, 11 Alberto Herreros, 12 José Antonio Paraíso, 13 Ferran Martínez, 14 Alfonso Reyes, 15 Roberto Dueñas (Coach: Lolo Sainz)

1998 FIBA World Cup: finished 5th among 16 teams

4 Alberto Angulo, 5 Nacho Rodilla, 6 Nacho Azofra, 7 Juan Antonio Orenga, 8 Ignacio Rodríguez, 9 Carlos Jiménez, 10 Rodrigo De la Fuente, 11 Alberto Herreros, 12 José Antonio Paraíso, 13 Iñaki de Miguel, 14 Alfonso Reyes, 15 Roberto Dueñas (Coach: Lolo Sainz)

1999 EuroBasket: finished 2nd  among 16 teams

4 Alberto Angulo, 5 Nacho Rodilla, 6 Iván Corrales, 7 Ignacio Romero, 8 Ignacio Rodríguez, 9 Carlos Jiménez, 10 Rodrigo De la Fuente, 11 Alberto Herreros, 12 Roger Esteller, 13 Iñaki de Miguel, 14 Alfonso Reyes, 15 Roberto Dueñas (Coach: Lolo Sainz)

2000 Olympic Games: finished 9th among 12 teams

4 Alberto Angulo, 5 Juan Carlos Navarro, 6 Raúl López, 7 Jorge Garbajosa, 8 Ignacio Rodríguez, 9 Carlos Jiménez, 10 Rodrigo De la Fuente, 11 Alberto Herreros, 12 Johnny Rogers, 13 Iñaki de Miguel, 14 Alfonso Reyes, 15 Roberto Dueñas (Coach: Lolo Sainz)

2001 EuroBasket: finished 3rd  among 16 teams

4 Pau Gasol, 5 Chuck Kornegay, 6 Paco Vázquez, 7 Juan Carlos Navarro, 8 Ignacio Rodríguez, 9 Felipe Reyes, 10 Carlos Jiménez, 11 Lucio Angulo, 12 José Antonio Paraíso, 13 Raúl López, 14 Alfonso Reyes, 15 Jorge Garbajosa (Coach: Javier Imbroda)

2002 FIBA World Cup: finished 5th among 16 teams

4 Pau Gasol, 5 Oriol Junyent, 6 Carles Marco, 7 Juan Carlos Navarro, 8 Ignacio Rodríguez, 9 Felipe Reyes, 10 Carlos Jiménez, 11 Lucio Angulo, 12 José Antonio Paraíso, 13 José Calderón, 14 Alfonso Reyes, 15 Jorge Garbajosa (Coach: Javier Imbroda)

2003 EuroBasket: finished 2nd  among 16 teams

4 Pau Gasol, 5 Roger Grimau, 6 Carles Marco, 7 Juan Carlos Navarro, 8 José Calderón, 9 Felipe Reyes, 10 Carlos Jiménez, 11 Alberto Herreros, 12 Rodrigo de la Fuente, 13 Antonio Bueno, 14 Alfonso Reyes, 15 Jorge Garbajosa (Coach: Moncho López)

2004 Olympic Games: finished 7th among 12 teams

4 Pau Gasol, 5 Iker Iturbe, 6 Jaume Comas, 7 Juan Carlos Navarro, 8 José Calderón, 9 Felipe Reyes, 10 Carlos Cabezas (C), 11 Óscar Yebra, 12 Roberto Dueñas, 13 Rudy Fernández, 14 Rodrigo De la Fuente, 15 Jorge Garbajosa (Coach: Mario Pesquera)

2005 EuroBasket: finished 4th among 16 teams

4 Rudy Fernández, 5 Iker Iturbe, 6 Carlos Cabezas, 7 Juan Carlos Navarro, 8 José Calderón, 9 Felipe Reyes, 10 Carlos Jiménez, 11 Sergi Vidal, 12 Sergio Rodríguez, 13 Iñaki de Miguel, 14 Fran Vázquez, 15 Jorge Garbajosa (Coach: Mario Pesquera)

2006 FIBA World Cup: finished 1st  among 24 teams

4 Pau Gasol (MVP), 5 Rudy Fernández, 6 Carlos Cabezas, 7 Juan Carlos Navarro, 8 José Calderón, 9 Felipe Reyes, 10 Carlos Jiménez, 11 Sergio Rodríguez, 12 Berni Rodríguez, 13 Marc Gasol, 14 Álex Mumbrú, 15 Jorge Garbajosa (Coach: Pepu Hernández)

2007 EuroBasket: finished 2nd  among 16 teams

4 Pau Gasol, 5 Rudy Fernández, 6 Carlos Cabezas, 7 Juan Carlos Navarro, 8 José Calderón, 9 Felipe Reyes, 10 Carlos Jiménez, 11 Sergio Rodríguez, 12 Berni Rodríguez, 13 Marc Gasol, 14 Álex Mumbrú, 15 Jorge Garbajosa (Coach: Pepu Hernández)

2008 Olympic Games: finished 2nd  among 12 teams

4 Pau Gasol, 5 Rudy Fernández, 6 Ricky Rubio, 7 Juan Carlos Navarro, 8 José Calderón, 9 Felipe Reyes, 10 Carlos Jiménez, 11 Raül López, 12 Berni Rodríguez, 13 Marc Gasol, 14 Álex Mumbrú, 15 Jorge Garbajosa (Coach: Aíto García Reneses)

2009 EuroBasket: finished 1st  among 16 teams

4 Pau Gasol (MVP), 5 Rudy Fernández, 6 Ricky Rubio, 7 Juan Carlos Navarro, 8 Víctor Claver, 9 Felipe Reyes, 10 Carlos Cabezas, 11 Raül López, 12 Sergio Llull, 13 Marc Gasol, 14 Álex Mumbrú, 15 Jorge Garbajosa (Coach: Sergio Scariolo)

2010 FIBA World Cup: finished 6th among 24 teams

4 Fernando San Emeterio, 5 Rudy Fernández, 6 Ricky Rubio, 7 Juan Carlos Navarro, 8 Raül López, 9 Felipe Reyes, 10 Víctor Claver, 11 Fran Vázquez, 12 Sergio Llull, 13 Marc Gasol, 14 Álex Mumbrú, 15 Jorge Garbajosa (Coach: Sergio Scariolo)

2011 EuroBasket: finished 1st  among 16 teams

4 Pau Gasol, 5 Rudy Fernández, 6 Ricky Rubio, 7 Juan Carlos Navarro (MVP), 8 José Calderón, 9 Felipe Reyes, 10 Víctor Claver, 11 Fernando San Emeterio, 12 Sergio Llull, 13 Marc Gasol, 14 Serge Ibaka, 15 Víctor Sada (Coach: Sergio Scariolo)

2012 Olympic Games: finished 2nd  among 12 teams

4 Pau Gasol, 5 Rudy Fernández, 6 Sergio Rodríguez, 7 Juan Carlos Navarro, 8 José Calderón, 9 Felipe Reyes, 10 Víctor Claver, 11 Fernando San Emeterio, 12 Sergio Llull, 13 Marc Gasol, 14 Serge Ibaka, 15 Víctor Sada (Coach: Sergio Scariolo)

2013 Eurobasket: finished 3rd  among 24 teams

4 Pablo Aguilar, 5 Rudy Fernández, 6 Sergio Rodríguez, 7 Xavi Rey, 8 José Calderón, 9 Ricky Rubio, 10 Víctor Claver, 11 Fernando San Emeterio, 12 Sergio Llull, 13 Marc Gasol, 14 Germán Gabriel, 15 Álex Mumbrú (Coach: Juan Antonio Orenga)

2014 FIBA World Cup: finished 5th among 24 teams

4 Pau Gasol, 5 Rudy Fernández, 6 Sergio Rodríguez, 7 Juan Carlos Navarro (C), 8 José Calderón, 9 Felipe Reyes, 10 Víctor Claver, 11 Ricky Rubio, 12 Sergio Llull, 13 Marc Gasol, 14 Serge Ibaka, 15 Álex Abrines (Coach: Juan Antonio Orenga)

2015 EuroBasket: finished 1st  among 24 teams

4 Pau Gasol (MVP), 5 Rudy Fernández, 6 Sergio Rodríguez, 7 Willy Hernangómez, 8 Pau Ribas, 9 Felipe Reyes, 10 Víctor Claver, 11 Fernando San Emeterio, 12 Sergio Llull, 13 Pablo Aguilar, 14 Nikola Mirotić, 15 Guillem Vives (Coach: Sergio Scariolo)

2016 Olympic Games: finished 3rd  among 12 teams

4 Pau Gasol, 5 Rudy Fernández, 6 Sergio Rodríguez, 7 Juan Carlos Navarro, 8 José Calderón, 9 Felipe Reyes,
10 Víctor Claver, 14 Willy Hernangómez, 21 Álex Abrines, 23 Sergio Llull, 44 Nikola Mirotić, 79 Ricky Rubio (Coach: Sergio Scariolo)

2017 EuroBasket: finished 3rd  among 24 teams

4 Pau Gasol, 6 Sergio Rodríguez, 7 Juan Carlos Navarro, 9 Ricky Rubio, 13 Marc Gasol, 14 Willy Hernangómez, 15 Joan Sastre, 16 Guillem Vives, 18 Pierre Oriola, 19 Fernando San Emeterio, 21 Álex Abrines, 41 Juan Hernangómez (Coach: Sergio Scariolo)

2019 FIBA World Cup: finished 1st  among 32 teams

1 Quino Colom, 5 Rudy Fernández (C), 8 Pau Ribas, 9 Ricky Rubio (MVP), 10 Víctor Claver, 13 Marc Gasol, 14 Willy Hernangómez, 18 Pierre Oriola, 22 Xavi Rabaseda, 23 Sergio Llull, 33 Javier Beirán, 41 Juan Hernangómez (Coach: Sergio Scariolo)

2020 Olympic Games: finished 6th among 12 teams

3 Xabier López-Arostegui, 4 Pau Gasol, 5 Rudy Fernández (C), 6 Sergio Rodríguez, 9 Ricky Rubio, 10 Víctor Claver, 13 Marc Gasol, 14 Willy Hernangómez, 16 Usman Garuba, 20 Alberto Abalde, 21 Álex Abrines, 23 Sergio Llull (Coach: Sergio Scariolo)

2022 EuroBasket: finished 1st  among 24 teams

2 Lorenzo Brown, 4 Jaime Pradilla, 5 Rudy Fernández (C), 6 Xabier López-Arostegui, 7 Jaime Fernández, 8 Darío Brizuela, 9 Alberto Díaz, 11 Sebas Saiz, 14 Willy Hernangómez (MVP), 16 Usman Garuba, 41 Juan Hernangómez, 44 Joel Parra (Coach: Sergio Scariolo)

Players
Bold denotes players still playing international basketball.

Most capped players

Top scorers

Top highscorers 
Top highscorers in official games (friendlies not included).

Top medallists 

Most medals won with the senior national team in (Olympic Games, World Cups and EuroBaskets):

Overall players records 
Most games played: Juan Carlos Navarro – 253 games played
Most points scored: Pau Gasol – 3,656 points scored
Most points scored in a single game: Jordi Villacampa – 48 points scored against Venezuela at the 1990 FIBA World Cup.
Played in most Summer Olympic Games:
5 – Juan Carlos Navarro (2000, 2004, 2008, 2012, and 2016), Rudy Fernández and Pau Gasol (2004, 2008, 2012, 2016, and 2020)
4 – Epi (1980, 1984, 1988, and 1992), Felipe Reyes and José Manuel Calderón (2004, 2008, 2012, and 2016)
Longest tenure in the national team: Pau Gasol (20 years), Juan Carlos Navarro (18 years), and Rudy Fernández (17 years).

Individual awards

International competitions
 FIBA World Cup MVP
 Pau Gasol – 2006
 Ricky Rubio – 2019
 FIBA World Cup All-Tournament Team
 Álvaro Salvadores – 1950
 Wayne Brabender – 1974
 Juan Antonio San Epifanio – 1982
 Alberto Herreros – 1998
 Jorge Garbajosa – 2006
 Pau Gasol – 2006, 2014
 Ricky Rubio – 2019
 Marc Gasol – 2019
 EuroBasket MVP
 Rafael Martín – 1935
 Emiliano Rodríguez – 1963
 Wayne Brabender – 1973
 Juan Antonio Corbalán – 1983
 Pau Gasol – 2009, 2015
 Juan Carlos Navarro – 2011
 Willy Hernangómez – 2022
 EuroBasket All-Tournament Team
 Clifford Luyk – 1969
 Francisco Buscató – 1973
 Wayne Brabender – 1973, 1975
 Juan Antonio Corbalán – 1983
 Juan Antonio San Epifanio – 1983
 Fernando Martín Espina – 1985
 Andrés Jiménez – 1987
 Antonio Martín Espina – 1991
 Jordi Villacampa – 1993
 Alberto Herreros – 1999
 Pau Gasol – 2001, 2003, 2007, 2009, 2011, 2015, 2017
 Juan Carlos Navarro – 2005, 2011
 José Calderón – 2007
 Rudy Fernández – 2007
 Marc Gasol – 2015
 Sergio Rodríguez – 2015
 Lorenzo Brown – 2022
 Willy Hernangómez – 2022
 EuroBasket Top Scorer
 Alberto Herreros – 1999
 Pau Gasol – 2003, 2009, 2015

Other notable achievements
 FIBA Hall of Fame
 Emiliano Rodríguez
 Fernando Martín Espina
 Juan Antonio San Epifanio
 Mr. Europa
 Juan Antonio San Epifanio – 1984
 Pau Gasol – 2004, 2009
 Jorge Garbajosa – 2006
 Ricky Rubio – 2008
 Juan Carlos Navarro – 2010
 Euroscar
 Pau Gasol – 2008, 2009, 2010, 2015
 Marc Gasol – 2014
 FIBA Europe Men's Player of the Year Award
 Pau Gasol – 2008, 2009
 All-NBA First Team
 Marc Gasol – 2015
 NBA All-Stars
 Pau Gasol – 2006, 2009, 2010,  2011, 2015, 2016
 Marc Gasol – 2012, 2015, 2017
 NBA champion
 Pau Gasol – 2009, 2010
 Marc Gasol – 2019
 Serge Ibaka – 2019
 NBA All-Rookie First Team
 Ricky Rubio – 2012
 Nikola Mirotić – 2015
 Willy Hernangómez – 2017
 EuroLeague MVP
 Juan Carlos Navarro – 2009
 Sergio Rodríguez – 2014
 Sergio Llull – 2017
 EuroLeague Final Four MVP
 Juan Carlos Navarro – 2010
50 Greatest EuroLeague Contributors (2008)
 Rafael Rullán
 Ignacio Solozábal
 Fernando Martín Espina
 Jordi Villacampa
 Juan Carlos Navarro

Head coaches

Most games as head coach: Antonio Díaz-Miguel: 423 games, over 27 years.
Most medals won with the national team: (8): Sergio Scariolo

Progression in the FIBA World Ranking

See also

Spanish Basketball Federation
Spain women's national basketball team
Spain national youth basketball teams
Sport in Spain

Notes

References

External links

 
Federation website 
Spain FIBA profile
Spain National Team – Men at Eurobasket.com
Spain Basketball Records at FIBA Archive

 
Men's national basketball teams
FIBA EuroBasket-winning countries
1934 establishments in Spain